Quercus microphylla is a Mexican species of oak in the beech family. It is widespread from Oaxaca as far north as Chihuahua, Coahuila, and Tamaulipas.

Description 

References

External links
photo of herbarium specimen collected in Coahuila in 1990

microphylla
Endemic oaks of Mexico
Plants described in 1801